Don Most (born August 8, 1953) is an American actor and singer, best known for his role as Ralph Malph on the television series Happy Days.

Early life
Most was born to a Jewish family in Brooklyn, New York City. He lived in Flatbush, Brooklyn, New York, and graduated from Erasmus Hall High School in 1970. He attended Lehigh University for three years from 1970 to 1973, but did not graduate. Originally intending to study engineering, he changed his major to business after his first semester. He made plans during his junior year to spend the summer of 1973 in search of acting jobs in Hollywood before completing his studies at Lehigh. Instead, he landed the Ralph Malph role on his third audition and moved to California to pursue acting full-time.

Acting credits
Most appeared on the 113th and final filmed but never aired episode of Room 222, entitled "Jason and Big Mo", in the role of Louie, the red-headed class wisecracker.  David Jolliffe had handled the role of Bernie, the red-headed class wisecracker, for all prior appearances.  Room 222 aired for the last time in January 1974, just as Happy Days began, and on the same network, ABC.

Most played jokester Ralph on Happy Days, regularly appearing up until the show’s seventh season and returned in the final season as a guest star. During the first season Most was more of a secondary character, billed only in the end credits, but by the second season he was front billed, as a primary character. 
Most has appeared in other film and television work. Film credits include Leo and Loree (1980), EDtv (1999), Planting Melvin (2005), and The Great Buck Howard (2008). He also made the regular round of guest appearances on TV shows like Emergency!, CHiPs, Baywatch, The Love Boat, Sliders, Star Trek: Voyager, Diagnosis: Murder, Yes, Dear, and Glee. He also made an appearance on Charles in Charge, alongside his former Happy Days co-star, Scott Baio. He plays a man who has just won the lottery and, as part of the cameo joke, he runs up to Baio and waving the winning ticket shouts, "It looks like happy days are here again!" (He also receives several looks from Baio that suggests familiarity throughout the episode.) He is sometimes credited as "Donny Most."

Most has also made stage appearances in plays like The Sunshine Boys with Robert Wuhl at Judson Theatre Company in 2017  and Middletown at Bucks County Playhouse in 2019.

Voice acting
Most performed as a voice actor on several Saturday morning cartoon series. Among these roles were: Ralph Malph on The Fonz and the Happy Days Gang (1980); Eric the Cavalier in Dungeons & Dragons (1983); and Stiles on Teen Wolf (1986–1989). Most had a cameo as himself in the fifth season Family Guy episode "It Takes a Village Idiot, and I Married One" in 2007.

Music career
United Artists released Most's only pop album, Donny Most, in the fall of 1976; it did not chart. A single from the album, "All Roads (Lead Back to You)" b/w "Better to Forget Her" (aided by Most performing it on an episode of Happy Days) spent three weeks on the Billboard Hot 100 in December 1976, peaking at #97; a second single, "One of These Days", was released as a promo to record stations only. Most released two other pop singles, "Here's Some Love" b/w "I'm Gonna Love Loving You" on the Venture label in 1978 and "I Only Want What's Mine", from the soundtrack of the film Leo and Loree (which starred Most and occasional Happy Days co-star Linda Purl) on Casablanca Records in 1980; neither record charted.

As of 2016, Most has switched to swing music, and released a Christmas CD, Swinging Down The Chimney Tonight on Summit Records; as of 2017, he was touring the U.S. in a show called "Donny Most Sings and Swings", performing a set of 1950s songs with a seven-piece backing band.

The songs "Ooo Baby Baby" and "Smoke from a Distant Fire" were released in 2021, with plans to release a new, full length album sometime in the near future.

Personal life
Most married actress Morgan Hart (daughter of burlesque queen Margaret Hart Ferraro) in 1982. They have two daughters and live near Los Angeles, California.

Happy Days lawsuit
On April 19, 2011, Most and four of his Happy Days co-stars, Erin Moran, Marion Ross, Anson Williams and the estate of Tom Bosley, who died in 2010, filed a $10 million breach-of-contract lawsuit against CBS, which owns the show, claiming they had not been paid for merchandising revenues owed under their contracts. The cast members claimed they had not received revenues from show-related items, including comic books, T-shirts, scrapbooks, trading cards, games, lunch boxes, dolls, toy cars, magnets, greeting cards, and DVDs where their images appear on the box covers. Under their contracts, they were supposed to be paid five percent from the net proceeds of merchandising if their sole image were used, and half that amount if they were in a group. CBS said it owed the actors $8,500 and $9,000 each, most of it from slot machine revenues, but the group said they were owed millions. The lawsuit was initiated after Ross was informed by a friend playing slots at a casino of a "Happy Days" machine on which players win the jackpot when five Marion Rosses are rolled.

In October 2011, a judge rejected the group's fraud claim, which meant they could not receive millions of dollars in potential damages. On June 5, 2012, a judge denied a motion filed by CBS to have the case thrown out, which meant it would go to trial on July 17 if the matter was not settled by then. In July 2012, the actors settled their lawsuit with CBS. Each received a payment of $65,000 and a promise by CBS to continue honoring the terms of their contracts.

References

External links

1953 births
Living people
American male television actors
American male voice actors
20th-century American male actors
Jewish American male actors
Lehigh University alumni
People from Flatbush, Brooklyn
Male actors from New York City
Erasmus Hall High School alumni
21st-century American male actors
21st-century American Jews